Tough Love (season 2) is the second season of the American reality television series Tough Love, which first aired on VH1. The show features nine women seeking relationship advice from the host and matchmaker, Steven Ward, and his mother JoAnn Ward, both of the Philadelphia based Master Matchmakers.

Contestants

Notes
 Taylor Royce appeared on the first season of Tough Love and returns to the cast this season.
 Kanisha Johnson appeared on the Tyra Banks Show and on the 2008 CW series Farmer Wants a Wife. She also made an appearance on an episode of Judge Pirro, suing friend Jessie Lewis IV for an unpaid loan. Recently, she appeared on Divorce Court (10/26/2010) accusing her (ex)husband of cheating with her best friend and spending her money without her knowledge.
 Melissa "Rocky" Brasselle appeared on the 2008 VH1 series I Know My Kid's a Star with her daughter. She introduces herself to her dates as Rocky or Raquel, not Melissa.
 Angel Moore appeared on LA Ink on Oct. 13, shown getting a tattoo by Ruthless on the episode "The Missing Piece".

Episode Progress

 The contestant had the best progress/date of the week
 The contestant was commended for good progress/date
 The contestant had average progress/date
 The contestant had poor progress/date
 The contestant had the worst progress/date of the week
 The contestant had good progress and was in the hot seat.
 The contestant returned from the previous season after leaving, and was included later in the episode.

Episodes

Episode 1
First aired November 15, 2009
 Challenge: First Impression
 Challenge Winner: Liz
 Weakest Participant: Kanisha
 Episode Notes:
Taylor from last season returns to boot camp at the end of the episode. Unlike last season, she no longer holds the title of "Miss Gold Digger".

Episode 2
First aired November 22, 2009
 Challenge: Communication
 Challenge Winner: Rocky
 Weakest Participant: Angel

Episode 3
First aired November 29, 2009
 Challenge: Sexiness
 Challenge Winner: Sally
 Weakest Participants: Tina & Taylor
 Episode Notes:
This was the first time that two people were put on the hot seat.

Episode 4
First aired December 6, 2009
 Challenge: Parental Skills
 Challenge Winner: Angel
 Weakest Participant: Taylor
 Episode Notes:
Liz decided to break up with Dave, whom she met in Episode 1.

Alicia decided to end her relationship with Jeff after Steve claimed that Jeff "is just not that into you."

Angel tells Adam about her son and her way of providing for him.

Episode 5
First aired December 13, 2009
 Challenge: The WOW Factor
 Challenge Winner: Taylor
 Weakest Participant: Jenna

Episode 6
First aired December 20, 2009
 Challenge: You Can't Handle the Truth
 Challenge Winner: Jenna
 Weakest Participant: Alicia

Episode 7
First aired January 3, 2010
 Challenge: Money Can't Buy me Love
 Challenge Winner: Sally
 Weakest Participant: Liz

Episode 8
First aired January 10, 2010
 Challenge: Revenge of the Exes
 Challenge Winner: Kanisha
 Weakest Participant: Jenna
 Episode Notes:
Liz got back together with Dave in this episode, whom she previously broke up with in Episode 4.
Angel confronted her fears about telling her parents about her exotic dancing, while Adam helped her through it.
At the end of the episode, Steve decides to "do things differently" and added an extra seat next to Jenna for Jeremy. The show ended on that cliffhanger.

Episode 9
First aired January 17, 2010
 Challenge: Ghosts of Dating Future
 Challenge Winner: Rocky
 Weakest Participant: Taylor

Episode 10
First aired January 24, 2010
 Challenge: Away We Go

Episode 11 (Season Finale)
Best: Angel

References

External links
 Tough Love Official Site @ VH1.com
 Tough Love - Full Episodes @ VH1.com
 Meet the Cast photos @ VH1.com

2009 American television seasons
2010 American television seasons